Edmund Francis Gilbert (June 29, 1931 – May 8, 1999) was an American actor, with extensive credits in both live-action roles and voice work in animation, although he was better known for the latter. He is also credited, under his birth name (Edmund Francis Giesbert), with research in entomology and the discovery of new beetle species.

Early life and Career
Gilbert graduated from the University of Chicago and fought in the Korean War. During the 1960s, Gilbert appeared on television series such as The Gallant Men, Combat!, The Rogues, and Mannix. In 1966, he guest starred as Robert Cramer on four episodes of Ben Casey. He is well known as Fenton Hardy on the 1970s television series The Hardy Boys/Nancy Drew Mysteries.

He provided the voices of Superion (originally voiced by Frank Welker), Thrust and Blitzwing in the second and third seasons of The Transformers, Kissyfur's father Gus in Kissyfur, Thirty-Thirty, Sandstorm, Shaman and other voices in BraveStarr, Baloo in the Disney animated series TaleSpin and Jungle Cubs, General Hawk in G.I. Joe: A Real American Hero, Puggsy and Daddy Starling in Tom and Jerry: The Movie, Mr. Smee in Peter Pan and the Pirates, Phasir in the Aladdin television series, The Mandarin in the first season of Iron Man: The Animated Series and Dormammu in Spider-Man. He voiced minor characters in Batman: The Animated Series; Batman: Mask of the Phantasm, Batman & Mr. Freeze: SubZero, and The New Batman Adventures. He also voiced the security guard Daryl in the computer game, Leisure Suit Larry 6: Shape Up or Slip Out!.

Entomology
Under his birth name, Edmund Francis Giesbert, he also pursued the study of Coleoptera and described a number of beetle species and genera, particularly in the family Cerambycidae, such as Linsleychroma, including Linsleychroma monnei.

Death
Gilbert died on May 8, 1999 of lung cancer in his home in Beverly Hills, California. He was survived by his wife Virgini and his daughter Dorian. His interment was at Eternal Valley Memorial Park and Mortuary in Newhall, California.

Filmography

References

External links
 
 

1931 births
1999 deaths
American male television actors
American male voice actors
Walt Disney Animation Studios people
Deaths from lung cancer in California
Male actors from Chicago
20th-century American male actors